Neanura is a genus of springtails in the family Neanuridae. There are more than 30 described species in Neanura.

Species
These 39 species belong to the genus Neanura:

 Neanura alba von Toerne, 1956
 Neanura aleo Christiansen & Bellinger, 1992
 Neanura aleuta (Bodvarsson, 1960)
 Neanura ambigua Christiansen & Bellinger, 1980
 Neanura aurantiaca (Caroli, 1912)
 Neanura bara Christiansen & Bellinger, 1980
 Neanura barberi (Handschin, 1928)
 Neanura bullsa Wray, 1953
 Neanura capitata (Folsom, 1932)
 Neanura citronella Carpenter, 1904
 Neanura coronifera Axelson, 1905
 Neanura deharvengi Smolis, Shayanmehr & Yoosefi, 2018
 Neanura eburnea Gisin, 1963
 Neanura giselae Gisin, 1950
 Neanura growae Christiansen & Bellinger, 1980
 Neanura hawaiiensis (Bellinger & Christainsen, 1974)
 Neanura ili Christiansen & Bellinger, 1992
 Neanura illina Christiansen & Bellinger, 1980
 Neanura insularum Carpenter, 1934
 Neanura judithae Smolis & Deharveng, 2017
 Neanura magna (Macgillivray, 1893) (bear-bodied springtail)
 Neanura minuta Gisin, 1963
 Neanura muscorum (Templeton, 1835)
 Neanura ornata Folsom, 1902
 Neanura pallida Deharveng, 1979
 Neanura palmeri Wray, 1967
 Neanura parva (Stach, 1951)
 Neanura persimilis Mills, 1934
 Neanura pini Becker, 1948
 Neanura prima (Bodvarsson, 1960)
 Neanura pseudoparva Rusek, 1963
 Neanura reticulata Axelson, 1905
 Neanura rosea (Gervais, 1842)
 Neanura serrata Folson, 1916
 Neanura servata Folsom
 Neanura setosa Canby, 1926
 Neanura tundricola Fjellberg
 Neanura villosa (Kos, 1940)
 Neanura weigneri (Stach, 1922)

References

Further reading

 

Neanuridae
Articles created by Qbugbot
Springtail genera